The 2019 World RX of Great Britain was the fourth round of the sixth season of the FIA World Rallycross Championship. The event was held at Silverstone Circuit in Silverstone, Northamptonshire.

Niclas Gronholm had intended to race in the British event but longer than planned recovery from the appendicitis that forced him out of the previous round in Belgium mean he also misses this weekend. Compatriot Joni Wiman, who finished on the podium with the GRX team in Spa, replaced him again.

Supercar 

Source

Heats

Semi-finals 

 Semi-Final 1

 Semi-Final 2

Final

Standings after the event 

Source

|- style="text-align:center"
|width="35%"|Previous race:2019 World RX of Belgium
|width="40%"|FIA World Rallycross Championship2019 season
|width="35%"|Next race:2019 World RX of Norway
|- style="text-align:center"
|width="35%"|Previous race:2018 World RX of Great Britain
|width="40%"|World RX of Great Britain
|width="35%"|Next race:-
|- style="text-align:center"

References 

Great Britain
World RX
World RX